Who's That Knocking at My Door, originally titled I Call First, is a 1967 American independent drama film written and directed by Martin Scorsese and starring Harvey Keitel and Zina Bethune. It was Scorsese's feature film directorial debut and Keitel's debut as an actor. Exploring themes of Catholic guilt similar to those in his later film Mean Streets, the story follows Italian-American J.R. (Keitel) as he struggles to accept the secret hidden by his independent and free-spirited girlfriend (Bethune).

This film was a nominee at the 1967 Chicago Film Festival.

Plot
J.R. is a typical Catholic Italian-American young man on the streets of New York City. Even as an adult, he stays close to home with a core group of friends with whom he drinks and carouses around. He gets involved with a local girl he meets on the Staten Island Ferry, and decides he wants to get married and settle down. As their relationship deepens, he declines her offer to have sex because he thinks she is a virgin and he wants to wait rather than "spoil" her.

One day, his girlfriend tells him that she was once raped by a former boyfriend. This crushes J.R., and he rejects her and attempts to return to his old life of drinking with his friends. However, after a particularly wild party with friends, he realizes he still loves her and returns to her apartment one early morning. He awkwardly tells her that he forgives her and says that he will "marry her anyway." Upon hearing this, the girl tells him marriage would never work if her past weighs on him so much. J.R. becomes enraged and calls her a whore, but quickly recants and says he is confused by the whole situation. She tells him to go home, and he returns to the Catholic church, but finds no solace.

Cast
 Zina Bethune as Girl
 Harvey Keitel as J.R. 
 Ann Collette as Girl In Dream
 Lennard Kuras as Joey 
 Michael Scala as Sally Gaga
 Harry Northup as Harry 
 Tuai Yu-Lan as Girl In Dream
 Saskia Holleman as Girl In Dream
 Bill Minkin as Iggy At Party 
 Philip Carlson as Boy In Copake 
 Wendy Russell as Gaga's Girl 
 Robert Uricola as Boy With Gun
 Susan Wood as Girl At Party 
 Marisa Joffrey as Girl At Party 
 Catherine Scorsese as Mother 
 Victor Magnotta as Boy In Fight
 Paul DeBonde as Boy In Fight

Martin Scorsese appears in an uncredited role as a gangster.

Production
Who's That Knocking at My Door was filmed in New York City over the course of two years, undergoing many changes, new directions and different names along the way. The film began in 1965 by Scorsese as a student short film about J.R. and his do-nothing friends called Bring on the Dancing Girls. In 1967, the romance plot with Zina Bethune was introduced and spliced together with the earlier film, and the title was changed to I Call First. Haig Manoogian, Scorsese's professor at NYU, provided $5,000 in seed money before raising an additional $65,000 from independent investors. Apart from the three producers, no one who worked on the film was over the age of twenty-five.

The film was shot with a combination of 35 mm and 16 mm cameras. Scorsese shot most of the 35 mm footage with a Mitchell BNC camera, a very cumbersome camera that impeded mobility. He opted to shoot several scenes with the 16 mm Eclair NPR camera in order to introduce greater mobility, then blow up the footage to 35 mm.

Release
The film received its world premiere at the Chicago International Film Festival in November 1967. A year later, in 1968, exploitation distributor Joseph Brenner offered to purchase the film and distribute it on the condition that a sex scene be added so they can market the film as a sex exploitation. Scorsese shot and edited a technically beautiful but largely gratuitous montage of J.R. fantasizing about bedding a series of prostitutes (shot in Amsterdam, the Netherlands with a visibly older Keitel). The film was re-titled Who's That Knocking at My Door (named for the 1959 song by The Genies which closes the film).

The film was re-issued in February 1970 by Medford Film Distribution under the title J.R.. However, all subsequent releases have been published under the 1968 title.

Reception
American critic Roger Ebert gave the film an extremely positive review after its world premiere at the Chicago International Film Festival in November 1967 (when it still went by the name I Call First). He called the film "a work that is absolutely genuine, artistically satisfying and technically comparable to the best films being made anywhere. I have no reservations in describing it as a great moment in American movies." Variety described the film as "more of a class exercise than a commercially sound film". The review later stated, "Scorsese occasionally brings the film to life, as in a weekend drive by J.R. and two buddies to an upstate village where the camera shows up their 'big city' shallowness in comparison to the townspeople. Generally, however, his script and direction lack any dramatic value and give far too much exposure to sexual fantasies on the part of the boy."

When the film received its theatrical release two years later, Ebert admitted that he had been perhaps too eager with his first review, admitting that "Scorsese was occasionally too obvious, and the film has serious structural flaws." However, he was still highly positive towards the film, and suggested that "It is possible that with more experience and maturity Scorsese will direct more polished, finished films." Vincent Canby of The New York Times acknowledged that Scorsese has "composed a fluid, technically proficient movie, more intense and sincere than most commercial releases." However, he felt Scorsese hadn't "succeeded in making a drama that is really much more aware than the characters themselves. The result is a movie that is as precise—and as small—as a contact print."

On Rotten Tomatoes the film holds an approval rating of 71% based on 21 reviews, with an average rating of 5.9/10. On Metacritic, the film has a weighted average score of 63 out of 100 based on nine critics, indicating "generally favorable reviews."

Notable appearances and cameos
Martin Scorsese's mother, Catherine, appears briefly as J.R.'s mother cooking at the beginning of the film and serving food near the end. Mrs. Scorsese would continue to appear in many of her son's films until her death in 1997. Scorsese himself appears uncredited as one of the gangsters. To this day, he still makes cameo appearances in many of his films.

The role of Sally Gaga is played by Michael Scala, the father of NYC Council District 32	2017 candidate and former rapper Michael "Pizon" Scala.

See also
List of American films of 1967
List of hood films

Notes

External links
 
 
 
 

1967 films
1967 directorial debut films
1967 drama films
1967 independent films
1960s American films
1960s English-language films
American black-and-white films
American drama films
American independent films
Films about Catholicism
Films about Italian-American culture
Films about rape
Films directed by Martin Scorsese
Films set in 1967
Films set in New York City
Films shot in Amsterdam
Films shot in New York City
Films shot in the Netherlands